The men's 200 metres competition at the 2018 Asian Games took place on 28 and 29 August 2018 at the Gelora Bung Karno Stadium.

Schedule
All times are Western Indonesia Time (UTC+07:00)

Records

Results
Legend
DNF — Did not finish
DNS — Did not start
DSQ  — Disqualified

Round 1
 Qualification: First 3 in each heat (Q) and the next 4 fastest (q) advance to the semifinals.

Heat 1
 Wind: −0.1 m/s

Heat 2
 Wind: −0.7 m/s

Heat 3
 Wind: −1.1 m/s

Heat 4
 Wind: +0.1 m/s

Semifinals
 Qualification: First 3 in each heat (Q) and the next 2 fastest (q) advance to the final.

Heat 1 
 Wind: −0.3 m/s

Heat 2 
 Wind: +0.2 m/s

Final 
 Wind: +0.7 m/s

References

Men's 200 metres
2018